Teddy Bear is a ghost town in Pennington County, South Dakota, United States.

References

Geography of Pennington County, South Dakota
Ghost towns in South Dakota